Gunadasa Amarasekera (born 1929) is a prominent Sinhala writer, poet, and essayist from Sri Lanka.

Early life and education
Gunadasa Amarasekera was born in Yattalamatta in Galle District. He was educated at Mahinda College, Galle and Nalanda College Colombo.

In the early fifties, his short story Soma was selected to represent Ceylon in a world short story competition organized by the New York Herald Tribune. It was published in the collection of World Prize Stories in 1952.

Dr  Amarasekara was presented with Nalanda Keerthi Sri award in 2010 by his alma mater Nalanda College, Colombo.

Amarasekera is a graduate of University of Ceylon and is a Dental Surgeon by profession.
He is one of the founding fathers of the Peradeniya school of literary tradition of modern Sri Lankan literature.

Publications
A list of literary works of Amarasekara,

Novels

Karumakkarayo (1953)
Yali Upannemi (1960)
Gandhabba Apadanaya (1969)
Asathya Kathawak (1981)
Premaye Sathya Kathawa (1983)
Gamanaka Mula (1988)
Gamdoren Eliyata (1990)
Vanka Giriyaka (1992)
Inimaga Ehalata (1992)
Yali Maga Wetha (1993)
Duru Rataka Dukata Kiriyaka (1999)

Short stories

Rathu Rosa Mala (1950)
Jeevana Suwanda (1957)
Ekama Kathawa (1972)
Katha Pahak (1975)
Gal Pilimaya Saha Bol Pilimaya (1989)
Marana Manchakaye Dutu Sihinaya (1993)

Poems

Bhaavageeta(1952)
Uyanaka Hinda Litu Kavi (1957)
Amal Bisso (1958)
Gurulu Watha (1972)
Avarjana (1972)
Asak Da Kava (2003)

Plays

Pavuru Padanam (1970)
Kavhandayaka Kathandaraya (1991)

Literary criticism

Vicharaya Saha Vinodaya (1951)
Aliya Saha Andayo (1966)
Abuddassa Yugayak (1976)
Anagarika Dharmapala Marxvaadida? (1980)
Ganaduru Madiyama Dakinemi Arunalu (1988)
Arunaluseren Arunodhyata (1991)
Jathika Chinthanaya saha Jaathika Aarthikaya (1993)
Sinhala Kawya Sampradaya (1996)

References

External links
Gunadasa Amarasekara, Library of Congress New Delhi Office.
 "Gunadasa Amarasekera: The dentist — philosopher rooted in Sinhala soil" an article by Malinda Seneviratne

 Gunadasa Amarasekara and contemporary Sinhalese literature
 A unique celebration for a writer

1929 births
Living people
Sri Lankan dentists
Sri Lankan novelists
Sri Lankan poets
People from Southern Province, Sri Lanka
Alumni of the University of Ceylon (Peradeniya)
Sri Lankan Buddhists
Alumni of Nalanda College, Colombo
Alumni of Mahinda College
Sri Lankan male writers
Male poets
Male novelists
20th-century poets
20th-century novelists
21st-century poets
21st-century novelists
20th-century male writers
21st-century male writers